The 2022 Korean FA Cup, known as Hana Bank FA Cup due to sponsorship agreement with Hana Bank, was the 27th edition of the Korean FA Cup. Similar to the previous year, U-League teams did not participate, and the top eight sides from the K5 League gained qualification instead.

Jeonnam Dragons were the defending champions, having won their fourth cup title the previous season, but were defeated by Busan Transportation Corporation in the round of 16.

Calendar

First round
The draw was held on 7 February 2022.

Second round
The draw was held on 7 February 2022.

Third round
The draw was held on 7 February 2022.

Round of 16
The draw was held on 7 February 2022.

Quarter-finals
The draw was held on 7 February 2022.

Semi-finals
The draw was held on 18 July 2022.

Final

Jeonbuk Hyundai Motors won 5–3 on aggregate.

References

External links
 Official FA Cup Page at KFA Website
 Korean FA Cup, Soccerway.com
 Operation Rule (Archived)

Korean FA Cup seasons
Korea, South